The Central Nova Tourist Association (CNTA) is one of seven provincially recognized tourist associations that work directly with Nova Scotia Department of Tourism Culture and Heritage. It is a membership based organization that is dedicated to promoting and supporting tourism in the Central Nova Scotia region (primarily along the Glooscap and Sunrise Trail).

Area Information

Central Nova Scotia is home to two distinct coasts.  On the southern coast is the Bay of Fundy.  Famous for its exceptionally high tides and variety of wildlife, the Bay of Fundy has played an important role in the history and culture of the people who live along its coastline.  Thousands of visitors frequent the area every summer to experience its natural beauty.  To the north is the Northumberland Strait, popular among residents and travellers alike for its warm waters and sandy beaches.

Colchester County
Cumberland County, Nova Scotia
Non-profit organizations based in Nova Scotia
Truro, Nova Scotia
Tourism agencies